American singer-songwriter Melanie Martinez has released two studio albums, four extended plays, ten singles, two promotional singles and twenty six music videos.

After her long journey on The Voice, Martinez signed a recording contract with Atlantic Records in 2014. Her debut EP, Dollhouse, was released in the same year and included her two first singles, "Dollhouse" and "Carousel". Her debut album, Cry Baby, was released in 2015. It peaked at number six on the US Billboard 200 and was certified platinum by the RIAA. Three singles, "Pity Party", "Soap", and "Sippy Cup", promoted the album.

Martinez's second studio album, K–12, was released in 2019. It peaked at number three on the Billboard 200 and reached the top ten in Australia, Canada, Ireland, New Zealand, and the United Kingdom. Martinez released the EP After School in September 2020, featuring "The Bakery", its lead single.

Studio albums

Extended plays

Singles

As lead artist

Promotional singles

Other charted and certified songs

Music videos

 "*" denotes that the music video was originally featured in the K–12 film.

Notes

References

Discographies of American artists